Lancaster  is a home rule-class city in Garrard County, Kentucky, in the United States. It is the seat of its county. As of the year 2010 U.S. census, the city population was 3,442.

Located south of Lexington, Lancaster is the site of the Kennedy House, sometimes said to have been the setting for Uncle Tom's Cabin.   The Civil War training base Camp Dick Robinson was located nearby.

Geography
Lancaster is located west of the center of Garrard County at  (37.618625, -84.579433). U.S. Route 27 passes through the city, leading north  to Lexington and south  to Somerset. Kentucky Route 52 crosses US 27 in the center of Lancaster, leading east and northeast  to Richmond, and west  to Danville.

Climate
The climate in this area is characterized by hot, humid summers and generally mild to cool winters.  According to the Köppen Climate Classification system, Lancaster has a humid subtropical climate, abbreviated "Cfa" on climate maps.

History
In 1797, Captain William Buford donated land for the establishment of a town around the site of Major Andrew Wallace's settlement at Wallace Crossroads. The surveying and platting was completed over the next year by Joseph Bledsoe Jr., and the community was named "Lancaster" for the Pennsylvania town, either because one of its settlers came from there or because the town was designed on a similar plan. The post office was established in 1801 and operated under the name "Lancaster Court House" until 1811. The city was formally incorporated by the state assembly in 1837.

Demographics

As of the census of 2000, there were 3,734 people, 1,585 households, and 1,020 families residing in the city. The racial makeup of the city was 88.14% White, 9.61% African American, 0.08% Native American, 1.12% from other races, and 1.04% from two or more races. Hispanic or Latino of any race were 1.96% of the population.

There were 1,585 households, out of which 29.1% had children under the age of 18 living with them, 45.2% were married couples living together, 15.6% had a female householder with no husband present, and 35.6% were non-families. 32.5% of all households were made up of individuals, and 17.1% had someone living alone who was 65 years of age or older. The average household size was 2.29 and the average family size was 2.89.

In the city, the population was spread out, with 23.0% under the age of 18, 9.6% from 18 to 24, 26.5% from 25 to 44, 19.7% from 45 to 64, and 21.1% who were 65 years of age or older. The median age was 38 years. For every 100 females, there were 83.5 males. For every 100 females age 18 and over, there were 76.6 males.

The median income for a household in the city was $26,175, and the median income for a family was $31,355. Males had a median income of $26,849 versus $21,108 for females. The per capita income for the city was $13,793. About 16.9% of families and 21.1% of the population were below the poverty line, including 27.0% of those under age 18 and 17.5% of those age 65 or over.

Education
Public education in Lancaster is administered by Garrard County Schools, which operates Garrard County High School.

Lancaster has a lending library, the Garrard County Public Library.

Notable people
 Simeon H. Anderson was a U.S. congressman from Kentucky.
 William J. Landram was an attorney and the colonel of the 19th Kentucky Infantry; brevet brigadier general, March 13, 1865.
 Jonathan Shell is the current representative for House District 36 in the Kentucky House of Representatives.
 William Owsley was a politician and jurist who became the sixteenth governor of Kentucky.
 Lewis L. Walker was a U.S. congressman from 1928 to 1930.
 Elizabeth Fouse was an activist dedicated to gaining equality for African American women.

References

External links
City of Lancaster official website

 
Cities in Kentucky
Cities in Garrard County, Kentucky
County seats in Kentucky